Gladicosa is a genus of wolf spiders found in the United States and Canada.

Species
, the World Spider Catalog accepted the following species:

Gladicosa bellamyi (Gertsch & Wallace, 1937) – USA
Gladicosa euepigynata (Montgomery, 1904) – USA
Gladicosa gulosa (Walckenaer, 1837) (type species) – USA, Canada
Gladicosa huberti (Chamberlin, 1924) – USA
Gladicosa pulchra (Keyserling, 1877) – USA

References

Lycosidae
Araneomorphae genera
Spiders of North America